Coilostylis falcata, formerly Epidendrum falcatum, is an orchid in the genus Coilostylis, a genus recently resurrected and split from Epidendrum.

This lithophytic wildflower is native in the western cordillera of Mexico. growing on rocks and cliff faces. This brittle plant propagates itself through fallen pseudobulbs.

The thick, lanceolate leaves are long and unusually pendent, growing up to 30 cm from a reduced pseudobulb The large, snow-white flowers grow from a shorter flower spike in overhanging tufts of no more than three flowers. These flowers are fragrant at night. They bloom in late spring.

Synonyms 
 Epidendrum parkinsonianum var. falcatum  (Lindl.) Ames & C.Schweinf, 1935 .
 Epidendrum falcatum (Lindl.) Withner & P.A.Harding, 2004

References and external links 

 Rhodehamel, W. A.,(2004). Epidendrum parkinsonianum: a lanky epiphyte for hobbyists with plenty of space., Orchids.

falcatum
Orchids of Mexico